Greatest Hits is a compilation album released by American singer Diana Ross. It was released by Tamla-Motown in 1972 in England and Australia, comprising singles from her studio albums Diana Ross (1970), Everything Is Everything (1970), and Surrender (1971). It reached number 34 on the UK Albums Chart and was certified gold by the British Phonographic Industry (BPI) for sales in excess of 100,000 copies.

Track listing

Charts

Certifications

References

1972 greatest hits albums
Diana Ross compilation albums